There were 0 female and 5 male athletes representing the country at the 2000 Summer Paralympics.

See also
2000 Summer Paralympics

References

Bibliography

External links
International Paralympic Committee

Nations at the 2000 Summer Paralympics
Paralympics
2000